Harriet Eleanor Hamilton-King (Mrs. Hamilton King) (1840–1920) was an English poet and devotional writer.

Life
King was born in Edinburgh and was the daughter of Admiral W. A. Baillie Hamilton and Lady Harriet Hamilton, sister of the Duke of Abercorn. In 1864, she married banker and publisher Henry Samuel King. She lived at the Manor House, Chigwell, Essex, all her married life, but after her husband's death in 1878 she moved with her children to another part of the country. Her strong sympathy for Mazzini and the cause of Italian unification inspired a number of her works. She was received into the Roman Catholic Church in 1890 by Cardinal Henry Edward Manning.

Works
Aspromonte and Other Poems (1869)
The Disciples (1873)
A Book of Dreams (1883)
The Sermon in the Hospital (from The Disciples) (1885)
Ballads of the North and Other Poems (1889)
The Prophecy of Westminster and Other Poems: in Honour of Henry Edward, Cardinal Manning (1895)
The Hours of the Passion and Other Poems (1902)
Letters and Recollections of Mazzini (1912)

References

External links
 
Alfred H. Miles (ed.), The Poets and the Poetry of the Nineteenth Century. Volume IX: Christina G. Rossetti to Katharine Tynan (1907) (18-page selection of King's verse)

1840 births
1920 deaths
Converts to Roman Catholicism
English Catholic poets
English women poets
English Roman Catholics
Writers from Edinburgh
Victorian women writers

Catholic poets